Ycatapom Peak ( or ) is a mountain in the Trinity Alps in California, United States.

The name "Ycatapom" comes from Wintu wayk'odipom, meaning "north step place".

References

External links
 

Mountains of Trinity County, California
Mountains of Northern California